Howon University is a private four-year comprehensive university located in Gunsan, South Korea. It is renowned for its high employment rate for its graduates.

History 
Established in 1977 as Gunsan Industrial College, it was elevated to a university in 1998.

For two consecutive years in 2009 and 2010, Howon University received a government funding amounting to US$5.4 million, as it was selected as a participant by the Ministry of Education for Korea's Educational Capability Improvement Project.

In 2013, the Ministry of Education of Korea certified Howon as the university with the highest recent graduates' employment rate in the whole country. In 2014, Howon placed second.

Organization 
There are six faculties and nine research institutes in Howon.

Notable people
Baek A-yeon, singer
Cha Hak-yeon (N), singer (VIXX)
Jung Taek Woon (Leo), singer (VIXX)
Kim Won-shik (Ravi), rapper (VIXX)
Hwang Chan-sung, singer (2PM)
Jang Wooyoung, singer (2PM)
Im Hyun-sik, singer (BtoB)
Lee Chang-sub, singer (BtoB)
Lee Jun-ho, singer (2PM)
Park Jin-young, singer (GOT7)
Jeong Se-woon, singer
Kim Jae-hwan, singer (Wanna One)
Raina, singer (After School, Orange Caramel)
Son Seung-yeon, singer
Bae Sung-yeon, singer (PRISTIN)

References

External links
 Howon University Official Website 

Gunsan
Private universities and colleges in South Korea
Universities and colleges in North Jeolla Province